The Cobble Hill Historic District is a municipal and national historic district located in the Cobble Hill neighborhood of Brooklyn, New York City.  The national district consists of 796 contributing, largely residential buildings built between the 1830s and 1920s. It includes fine examples of Greek Revival, Italianate, and Queen Anne style row houses.  Also in the district are a number of notable churches, including ones by Richard Upjohn (Christ Church, 1841–42) and Minard Lafever (St. Francis Cabrini Chapel, originally Strong Place Baptist Church), 1851–52).  A number of early 20th century apartment buildings are part of the district as well.

The Cobble Hill Historic District was first designated a New York City landmark by the New York City Landmarks Preservation Commission in 1969. It was then listed on the National Register of Historic Places in 1976.  The city extended the district in 1988.

Gallery

See also
List of New York City Designated Landmarks in Brooklyn
National Register of Historic Places listings in Kings County, New York

References

External links

Cobble Hill, Brooklyn
Greek Revival architecture in New York City
Historic districts on the National Register of Historic Places in Brooklyn
Italianate architecture in New York City
New York City designated historic districts
New York City Designated Landmarks in Brooklyn
Queen Anne architecture in New York City